Brusów  is a village in the administrative district of Gmina Ryki, within Ryki County, Lublin Voivodeship, in eastern Poland.

Economy
The economy of Brusów is primarily based on agriculture.

References

Villages in Ryki County